The Metaphysics of Morals is a 1797 work of political and moral philosophy by Immanuel Kant. In structure terms, it is divided into two sections: the Doctrine of Right, dealing with rights, and the Doctrine of Virtue, dealing with virtues.

Kant's development of his ethical theories in the work include an evolution of the "categorical imperative" concept and an exploration of the consequences of treating humanity as rational beings in the context of duties.

Summary 

The work is divided into two main parts, the Rechtslehre and the Tugendlehre. Mary J. Gregor's translation (1991) explains these German terms as, respectively, the Doctrine of Right, which deals with the rights that people have or can acquire, and the Doctrine of Virtue, which deals with the virtues they ought to acquire.

Rechtslehre has also been translated as the Science of Right (Hastie) or the Metaphysical Elements of Justice (Ladd). It is grounded in republican interpretation of origins of political community as civil society and establishment of positive law. Published separately in 1797, the Doctrine of Right is one of the last examples of classical republicanism in political philosophy. The Doctrine of Right contains the most mature of Kant's statements on the peace project and a system of law to ensure individual rights.

The Doctrine of Virtue develops further Kant's ethical theory, which Kant first laid out in the Groundwork of the Metaphysics of Morals (1785). Kant particularly emphasizes treating humanity as an end in itself; in fact Kant's retake of the second formulation of the categorical imperative (e.g. Groundwork of the Metaphysics of Morals) makes it possible to deduce duties. The duties are analytically treated by Kant, who distinguishes duties towards ourselves from duties towards others. The duties are classified as perfect duties and imperfect duties. Kant thinks imperfect duties allow a latitudo, i.e., the possibility of choosing maxims. The perfect duties instead do not allow any latitudo and determine exactly the maxims of actions.

Thus, Kant distinguishes "Virtue" and "Right": the "Doctrine of Right" contains rights as perfect duties towards others only.

Influence
In the English-speaking world, the Metaphysics of Morals (1797) is not as well known as Kant's earlier works, the Groundwork of the Metaphysics of Morals (1785) and the Critique of Practical Reason (1788), but it has experienced a renaissance through the pioneering work of Mary J. Gregor.

English translations
Translations of the entire book:
 Kant, Immanuel. The Metaphysics of Morals. Translated by Mary J. Gregor. Cambridge University Press, 1991. .
 Kant, Immanuel. The Metaphysics of Morals. Translated by Mary J. Gregor. Cambridge University Press, 1996. .
 Kant, Immanuel. The Metaphysics of Morals. In Practical Philosophy. Edited by Mary J. Gregor. Cambridge University Press, 1996.
 Translated by Anonymous (John Richardson), "Metaphysic of Morals divided into Metaphysical Elements of Law and of Ethics." 2 vols. (London [Hamburg]: William Richardson, 1799).

Translations of Part I:
 Kant, Immanuel. The Philosophy of Law: An Exposition of the Fundamental Principles of Jurisprudence as the Science of Right. Translated by W. Hastie. Edinburgh: T. & T. Clark, 1887; reprinted by Augustus M. Kelly Publishers, Clifton, NJ, 1974. [introduction and all of part I]
 Kant, Immanuel. The Metaphysical Elements of Justice; Part I of the Metaphysics of Morals. 1st ed. Translated by John Ladd. Indianapolis: Bobbs-Merrill, 1965. [introduction and most of part I]
 Kant, Immanuel. The Metaphysics of Morals. In Kant: Political Writings. 2nd enl. ed. Edited by Hans Reiss. Translated by H. B. Nisbet. Cambridge: Cambridge University Press, 1991. [selections from part I]
 Kant, Immanuel. The Metaphysical Elements of Justice; Part I of the Metaphysics of Morals. 2nd ed. Translated by John Ladd. Indianapolis: Bobbs-Merrill, 1999. [introduction and all of part I]
 Kant, Immanuel. Metaphysics of Morals, Doctrine of Rights, Section 43-section 62. In Toward Perpetual Peace and Other Writings on Politics, Peace, and History. Edited by Pauline Kleingeld. Translated by David L. Colclasure. New Haven: Yale University Press, 2006. [selections from part I, concerning public right]

Translations of Part II:
 Kant, Immanuel, The Doctrine of Virtue. Translated by Mary J. Gregor. New York: Harper & Row Torchbooks, 1964; reprinted by the University of Pennsylvania Press, 1971.
 Translated by James Wesley Ellington, in Ethical Philosophy. Indianapolis: Hackett, 1983 [1964]. [Part II]
 Translated by John William Semple, "The Metaphysic of Ethics." Edinburgh: Thomas Clark, 1836; Reprint editions include 1871, ed. Henry Calderwood (Edinburgh: T. & T. Clark). [Introduction and portions of part II]

See also

1797 in literature
Anthropology
Ethics
Immanuel Kant bibliographyThe Critique of Practical ReasonThe Groundwork of the Metaphysics of MoralsReligion Within the Boundaries of Mere ReasonKantianism
Philosophy of life

References

External links

 The Philosophy of Law: An Exposition of the Fundamental Principles of Jurisprudence as the Science of Right, full text of the introduction and part I of the Metaphysics of Morals.
 An explanation of the division between the two parts, and what Kant means by virtue.
 Die Metaphysik der Sitten, full German text of the Metaphysics of Morals (from Korpora).
 Book Review of Mary Gregor's 1991 translation of the Metaphysics of Morals'', by Steven Palmquist.
Kant and the Moral Necessity of Civil Society, full text of political theory work by Dr. Jacqueline Augustine.

1797 non-fiction books
Books by Immanuel Kant
Enlightenment philosophy
Ethics books
German non-fiction books